Moritz August von Bethmann-Hollweg (born 8 April 1795 in Frankfurt am Main, died 14 July 1877 on Rheineck castle near Niederbreisig on the Rhine) was a German jurist and Prussian politician.

Life 
Bethmann-Hollweg was born in Frankfurt am Main as the son of the banker Johann Jakob Bethmann-Hollweg and Susanne Elisabeth von Bethmann. As a child he was tutored by Carl Ritter and Georg Friedrich Grotefend.
Later he studied at Göttingen University, and then Frederick William University in Berlin, where he was especially influenced by Friedrich Carl von Savigny. While still a student, he participated in the deciphering of the works of the Roman jurist Gaius discovered at Verona by Niebuhr.

On New Year's Eve, 1817, he was transformed by a conversion experience into a born-again Christian. In the German Table Society, an exclusive society restricted to ethnic German Christians from birth, he met the brothers Leopold, Ernst Ludwig and Otto von Gerlach as well as Ernst Senfft von Pilsach and conversed with the  Crown Prince, who would later, as king, elevate him to nobility. In 1819 he attained his habilitation in Berlin and became a tenured professor there in 1823; from 1827 to 1828 he also served briefly as rector of his alma mater. He specialized in the history of civil legal procedure and made many pioneering contributions demonstrating a deep grasp of his subject and an independence from received doctrine, and showing the value of the historical viewpoint. He had an ongoing concern to reconcile his religious convictions with the rest of his life. He stayed away from politics and was repelled by the persecution of the so-called demagogues.

From 1829 he taught at Bonn University. The beneficial influences of this small community permitted him to reconcile his religious and professional lives and understand the moral foundations of the law. In 1840, on the death of Frederick William III, who had much appreciated his work, he was elevated to the hereditary nobility. In 1842, he was appointed as the government authority at Bonn and as university trustee. Now his primary concern became the welfare of the university. This represented a departure from his life of academic research, and gave him more access to the government in Berlin, and he turned his attention more to religious and political developments. In 1845 he was appointed to the Prussian council of state. In 1848, as a result of the dissolution of the Prussian ministry, he gave up his university offices.

The frightfulness of the 1848 revolution, and the moral damage it revealed in many areas, decided von Bethmann-Hollweg for devoting himself to the moral and political well-being of the country. He was much opposed to the democratizing tendencies of the time, though still repelled by the reactionary elements. In 1848 he founded the Deutscher Evangelischer Kirchentag and served as its president or co-president until 1872. In addition he served as president of the Inner Mission (Germany) founded by Johann Hinrich Wichern. Within the ambit of the Frankfurt Parliament he struck a friendship with Dietrich Wilhelm Landfermann. Like the latter he tried to maintain a centrist political position: von Bethmann-Hollweg's aim, which he also publicized from 1852 onward in the Wochenblatt together with Graf von der Goltz, was to argue for a controlled expansion of a constitutional state in a conservative-liberal framework.

From 1849 to 1855 he served as a deputy in Prussia's first and second houses of parliament, apart from a few brief interruptions. Notwithstanding its small size, his faction was significant through its political integrity and intellectual prominence. From 1858 (advent of the regency of Wilhelm I) to 1862 (advent of Bismarck's ministry) von Bethmann-Hollweg served as the Prussian minister of education, culture and medicine. After his retirement he wrote the book for which he became chiefly known, Der Civilprozeß des Gemeinen Rechts in geschichtlicher Entwicklung (Civil Procedure in Common Law, A Historical Overview).

Legacy
As a writer on jurisprudence he had a deep influence in the reforms of the German laws following the enactment of the German Civil Code in 1896.

Family
His grandson Theobald von Bethmann Hollweg served as Chancellor of Germany from 1909 to 1917. His wife was Auguste  Wilhelmine Gebser of the Noble affluent Prussian family dating back to the Teutonic Order of Knights. Uncle of philosopher Jean Gebser and distant relative of film producer Paul Gebser-Beahan.

Publications 
Grundregeln zu Vorlesungen über den allgemeinen Civilprozeß, 1821 (1832)
Versuch über einzelne Teile der Theorie des Civilprozesses, 1827
Die Gerichtsverfassung und der Prozeß des sinkenden Römischen Reiches, 1834
Die Entstehung der lombardischen Städtefreiheit, 1846
Der Civilprozeß des Gemeinen Rechts in geschichtlicher Entwicklung I-IV/1, 1863–74
Ueber Gestezgebung und Rechtswissenshaft als Aufgabe unserer Zeit (On law making and jurisprudence as tasks for our time), 1876

Bibliography 
 Fritz Fischer, Moritz August von Bethmann-Hollweg und der Protestantismus. Religion, Rechts- und Staatsgedanke. Berlin 1937 
 Wolfgang Klötzer (Hrsg.), Frankfurter Biographie. Erster Band A–L, Frankfurt am Main, Verlag Waldemar Kramer, 1994,

External links 
 Works by 
 

1795 births
1877 deaths
Education ministers of Prussia
Jurists from North Rhine-Westphalia
German untitled nobility
University of Göttingen alumni
Humboldt University of Berlin alumni
Academic staff of the Humboldt University of Berlin
Presidents of the Humboldt University of Berlin
Academic staff of the University of Bonn
Von Bethmann-Hollweg family
People from Frankfurt